Union Sportive Suisse de Paris, also known as simply US Suisse or Suisse Paris, is  a French amateur football club based in Paris. The club was founded in 1894 under the name United Sports Club and currently play in the Promotion d'Honneur of the Ligue Île-de-France, the ninth division of the French football league system. Under the United Sports Club emblem, Suisse Paris participated in France's second-ever football championship in 1895. The club's best finish in the competition was during the 1903–04 season when the club finished second to RC Roubaix. In the previous season, the club won the 1903 edition of the Coupe Dewar. In 1906, the club merged with FC Switzerland and, four years later, officially adopted the club's current name. 

As stated in the name, the club is known for its relationship with the country of Switzerland. Suisse Paris regularly recruits players from the country and many of the club's past presidents have been either Swiss-born or of Swiss heritage. The club is a founding member of the Ligue Île-de-France and the French Football Federation. Suisse Paris formerly played their home matches at the Stade Fernand Sastre in Saint-Maur-des-Fossés, named after the former FFF president, and currently host matches at the Stade Mairie de Paris in Porte Dauphine not far from Paris Dauphine University.

Honours
French Football Runner up: 1903–04 
Coupe Dewar winner: 1903
Founding member of the Ligue Île-de-France and the French Football Federation

References

External links
 Official site

Association football clubs established in 1894
Football clubs in Paris
1894 establishments in France
Sport in Val-de-Marne